Paul Crook (born ) is an English former professional rugby league footballer who played in the 1990s. He played at club level for Stanley Rangers ARLFC, and Oldham (Heritage № 1041) in 1996's Super League I.

Background
Paul Crook was born in Wakefield, West Riding of Yorkshire.

References

External links
Stanley Rangers ARLFC - Roll of Honour

1974 births
Living people
English rugby league players
Oldham R.L.F.C. players
Rugby league players from Wakefield